Rinkeby was a borough (stadsdelsområde) in Stockholm, Sweden until 1 January 2007, practically identical to the district of Rinkeby. In 2007, Rinkeby merged with the borough of Kista to form the Rinkeby-Kista borough.

External links 
Rinkeby - Official site

Government of Stockholm

hu:Rinkeby (kerület)